Romanowo  is a village in the administrative district of Gmina Kłodzko, within Kłodzko County, Lower Silesian Voivodeship, in south-western Poland. Prior to 1945 it was in Germany.

References

Romanowo